The Cignal HD Spikers are a professional women's volleyball team in the Philippines.  The club is owned by Cignal TV, Inc., a subsidiary of MediaQuest Holdings, Inc., a PLDT company.

Current roster
For the 2023 Premier Volleyball League All-Filipino Conference:

Coaching staff
 Head coach: Shaq Delos Santos
 Assistant coach(s): Rico de Guzman
 Trainer(s): Edwin Ajon

Team Staff
 Team Manager: Ken Silverio Ucang

Medical Staff
 Team Physician: 
 Physical Therapist: Mike Cabungan
 Physical Trainer: Gabriel Atienza

Previous roster
For the 2022 Premier Volleyball League Reinforced Conference:

Coaching staff
 Head coach: Shaq Delos Santos
 Assistant coach(s): Rico de Guzman
 Trainer(s): Edwin Ajon

Team Staff
 Team Manager: Ken Silverio Ucang

Medical Staff
 Team Physician: 
 Physical Therapist: Mike Cabungan
 Physical Trainer:
 Gabriel Atienza

For the 2022 Premier Volleyball League Invitational Conference:

Coaching staff
 Head coach: Shaq Delos Santos
 Assistant coach(s): Rico de Guzman
 Trainer(s): Edwin Ajon

Team Staff
 Team Manager: Ken Silverio Ucang

Medical Staff
 Team Physician: 
 Physical Therapist: Mike Cabungan
 Physical Trainer: Gabriel Atienza

For the 2022 Premier Volleyball League Open Conference:

Coaching staff
 Head coach: Shaq Delos Santos
 Assistant coach(s): Rico de Guzman
 Trainer(s): Edwin Ajon

Team Staff
 Team Manager: Ken Silverio Ucang

Medical Staff
 Team Physician: 
 Physical Therapist: Mike Cabungan
 Physical Trainer: Gabriel Atienza

For the 2021 PVL Open Conference:

Coaching staff
 Head coach: Shaq Delos Santos
 Assistant coach(s): Rico de Guzman
 Trainer(s): Edwin Ajon

Team Staff
 Team Manager: Ken Silverio Ucang

Medical Staff
 Team Physician: 
 Physical Therapist: Mike Cabungan
 Physical Trainer: Gabriel Atienza

For the 2020 PSL Grand Prix Conference:

For the 2019 PSL Grand Prix Conference:

Coaching staff
 Head coach: Edgar Barroga
 Assistant coach(s): Rico de Guzman
 Trainer(s): Edwin Ajon

Team Staff
 Team Manager: Ken Silverio Ucang

Medical Staff
 Team Physician: 
 Physical Therapist: Mike Cabungan
 Physical Trainer: Gabriel Atienza

For the 2018 PSL Invitational Cup:

Coaching staff
 Head coach: Edgar Barroga
 Assistant coach(s): Rico de Guzman
 Trainer(s): Edwin Ajon
 Strength and conditioning Coach(s): Mike Cabungan

Team Staff
 Team Manager: Edgar Barroga
 Team Utility: Francis Paular

Medical Staff
 Team Physician: 
 Physical Therapist: Gabriel Atienza

For the 2018 PSL Grand Prix Conference:

Coaching staff
 Head coach: Edgar Barroga
 Assistant coach(s): Rico de Guzman
 Trainer(s): Edwin Ajon
 Strength and conditioning Coach(s): Mike Cabungan

Team Staff
 Team Manager: Edgar Barroga
 Team Utility: Francis Paular

Medical Staff
 Team Physician: 
 Physical Therapist: Gabriel Atienza

For the 2017 PSL Grand Prix Conference:

Coaching staff
 Head coach: George Pascua
 Assistant coach(s): Michelle Laborte

Team Staff
 Team Manager: Edgar Barroga
 Team Utility: 

Medical Staff
 Team Physician: Gabriel Atienza
 Physical Therapist: Edwin Ajon

For the 2017 PSL Invitational Cup:

Coaching staff
 Head coach: George Pascua
 Assistant coach(s): Michelle Laborte

Team Staff
 Team Manager: Edgar Barroga
 Team Utility: 

Medical Staff
 Team Physician: Gabriel Atienza
 Physical Therapist: Edwin Ajon

For the 2017 PSL All-Filipino Conference:

Coaching staff
 Head coach: George Pascua
 Assistant coach(s): Michelle Laborte

Team Staff
 Team Manager: Edgar Barroga
 Team Utility: 

Medical Staff
 Team Physician: Gabriel Atienza
 Physical Therapist: Edwin Ajon

Coaching staff
 Head coach: Michael Cariño
 Assistant coach(s): Marcelo Joaquin Jr.

Team Staff
 Team Manager: Jose Christopher Cadua
 Team Utility: 

Medical Staff
 Team Physician: Gabriel Atienza
 Physical Therapist: Dexter Clamor

Honors

Team
Premier Volleyball League:

Individual
Premier Volleyball League:

Team captains
  Venus Bernal (2013)
  Michelle Datuin (2013 - 2014)
  Honey Royse Tubino (2014)
  Charisse Vernon Ancheta (2015)
  Michelle Laborte (2015 - 2016)
  Stephanie Mercado (2017)
  Rachel Anne Daquis (2018 - present)

Imports

Coaches
 Sammy Acaylar (2013-2016)
 George Pascua (2017)
 Edgar Barroga (2018–2020)
 Shaq Delos Santos (2021-)

See also
 Cignal HD Spikers (men's team)
 PLDT Volleyball Club
 PLDT Home Fibr Hitters

References

External links
 PSL-Cignal HD Spikers Page
 2013 Philippine Super Liga Grand Prix Final Results

Women's volleyball teams in the Philippines
Philippine Super Liga
Spikers' Turf
2013 establishments in the Philippines
Volleyball clubs established in 2013
Premier Volleyball League (Philippines)
Shakey's V-League